Needle Park may refer to:

The Panic in Needle Park, a 1971 film
Verdi Square and Sherman Square in Manhattan
Platzspitz park in Switzerland
O'Bryant Square in Portland, Oregon